KDIF-LP is a low-power FM radio station on 102.9 FM in Phoenix, Arizona. The station is owned and operated by the Arizona Interfaith Alliance for Worker Justice, with studios and transmitter on South 16th Street in Phoenix.

History

On March 10, 2014, KDIF-LP was granted its original construction permit. The station came to air in March 2017.

Not all areas of the city of Phoenix can receive KDIF-LP; a translator for KIHP 1310 AM also broadcasts on the frequency from Shaw Butte.

External links
 

DIF-LP
DIF-LP
Radio stations established in 2017
2017 establishments in Arizona
Community radio stations in the United States